Jonathan Brearley (23 July 1973) is the chief executive officer of Great Britain energy regulator Office of Gas and Electricity Markets.

Early life 

Brearley grew up in Wiltshire. His father served in the Royal Navy and later became a chartered surveyor. He attended Gillingham School comprehensive school in Dorset, and then studied maths and physics at University of Glasgow and economics at University of Cambridge.

Career 

Brearley worked in Prime Minister Tony Blair’s strategy unit within 10 Downing Street from 2002 to 2006. He then transferred to work for the Department for Environment, Food and Rural Affairs while David Miliband was Secretary of State, where Brearley was tasked with setting up the Office of Climate Change. He then moved to the Department of Energy and Climate Change where he was director of electricity markets and networks.

After leaving the UK civil service, Brearley ran a consultancy working on projects in the energy industry including market reforms in India.

In February 2021, Brearley was appointed interim CEO of the UK Regulators Network. Then became CEO in March 2021.

Personal life 

Brearley is married with two sons. They own a farmhouse in Buckinghamshire valued at £1 million, and another property in Dorset.

References 

Living people
People from Wiltshire
Alumni of the University of Glasgow
Alumni of the University of Cambridge
1973 births